Vadym Voronchenko (born 11 January 1989) is a professional Ukrainian football midfielder.

Career
Native of Poltava Oblast, Voronechenko is a product of FC Dynamo Kyiv.

He made his professional debut for FC Dynamo-2 Kyiv in the Ukrainian First League.

Hounours
Desna Chernihiv
 Ukrainian Second League: 2012–13

References

External links

 

1989 births
Living people
Ukrainian footballers
Ukrainian expatriate footballers
FC Dynamo-2 Kyiv players
FC Dynamo-3 Kyiv players
FC Oleksandriya players
MFC Mykolaiv players
FC Desna Chernihiv players
FC Poltava players
SC Tavriya Simferopol players
FC Hirnyk-Sport Horishni Plavni players
FC Zhemchuzhyna Yalta players
FC Nove Zhyttya Andriivka players
FC Metalurh Zaporizhzhia players
FC Kremin Kremenchuk players
Speranța Nisporeni players
Association football midfielders
Ukrainian expatriate sportspeople in Moldova
Expatriate footballers in Moldova
Ukrainian First League players
Ukrainian Second League players
Moldovan Super Liga players
Sportspeople from Poltava Oblast